Tiny Times, also known as Tiny Times 1.0 is the first installment of the film series written and directed by Guo Jingming and based on the best-selling novel of the same name also by Guo.

Plot
The four young women are classmates in high school and roommates in college. On campus, they start their internships and cope with a series of romantic affairs. After graduation, they continue their correspondence, suffused with misunderstanding and jealousy. However, they have all changed significantly.

After graduation, Lin Xiao settles into her job as an editorial assistant at a fashion magazine and acclimating herself to the glamorous, high-octane world of haute couture. She meets her demanding and cold boss, Gong Ming, whose melancholic persona is described by Lin Xiao as “a distant, lonely planet in the universe”. Her work puts her relationship with her high school sweet heart, Jian Xi in peril.

Meanwhile, Gu Li faces struggle in her relationship with Gu Yuan at the intervention of his mother, who seeks to marry him off to an even wealthier family. Nan Xiang paints to support her fashion design studies, while at the same time struggle with her on-and-off relationship with abusive boyfriend Xi Cheng. Wan Ru worries that her aspirations in life are never really made certain, and the fact that she might not get a boyfriend.

Cast
 Yang Mi as Lin Xiao
 Kai Ko as Gu Yuan
 Amber Kuo as Gu Li
 Rhydian Vaughan as Gong Ming
 Bea Hayden as Nan Xiang
 Evonne Hsieh as Tang Wanru
 Cheney Chen as Zhou Chongguang
 Li Yueming as Jian Xi
 Jiang Chao as Xi Cheng
 Kitty Shang as Kitty
 Calvin Tu as Wei Hai
 Wang Lin as Ye Chuanping
 Ding Qiaowei as Yuan Yi

Release and reception

Box office
The film grossed US$79.7 million at the Chinese box office.

Accolades

Original soundtrack

References

External links
 

 
Films set in Shanghai
Films shot in Shanghai
Films based on Chinese novels
Chinese romantic drama films
2013 romantic drama films
Adaptations of works by Guo Jingming
Le Vision Pictures films
2013 films